George Cleeve (–after November 1666) was an early settler and founder of today's Portland, Maine. He was Deputy President of the Province of Lygonia from 1643 until the final submission of its Maine towns to Massachusetts authority in 1658.

Life and career 
Born about 1586 in Stogursey, Somersetshire, England, Cleeve came to what is now New England in 1630, settling first in Spurwink, Maine (near today's Cape Elizabeth), and at Falmouth (today's Portland) in 1633.  In 1637, Sir Ferdinando Gorges granted Cleeve and associate Richard Tucker  at Machegonne (Portland Neck) that included the area of today's downtown Portland.

His career was both contentious and litigious, engaged in frequent land disputes and vying with Gorges' Province of Maine for jurisdiction over the area north of Cape Porpoise.  He is known to have convened provincial courts at Casco in 1644 and Black Point in 1648.

Under Massachusetts governance of the area, he was Commissioner for Falmouth (from 1658) and Representative to the General Court, 1663–1664.

Cleeve married Joan Price on 7 September 1618. Their daughter, Elizabeth (born 1619), married in 1637 Michael Mitton.

Death 
Cleeve died sometime after November 1666, according to the last known record of his life. He is buried in Evergreen Cemetery in Portland.

References 
Noyes, Libby, Davis, Genealogical Dictionary of Maine and New Hampshire (Genealogical Publishing Company reprint, 1996)
James Phinney Baxter, George Cleeve of Casco Bay (Gorges Society, 1885)
W. Williamson, "History of Maine", Volume I
Robert C. Anderson, The Great Migration Begins, bio. entry.

1580s births
Year of death missing
Politicians from Portland, Maine
People of colonial Maine
People from Sedgemoor (district)
People of pre-statehood Maine
English emigrants

Burials at Evergreen Cemetery (Portland, Maine)